"Comme des enfants" is a song by Canadian singer Cœur de pirate from her first studio album Cœur de pirate. It was released as a single on 28 September 2009. In 2014, an instrumental version of the song was used in an advertisement for Disneyland Paris.

Charts

References

2008 songs
2009 singles
Cœur de pirate songs